Svein Bergersen (6 August 1930 – 14 November 2005) was a Norwegian footballer. He played in three matches for the Norway national football team from 1955 to 1959.

References

External links
 

1930 births
2005 deaths
Norwegian footballers
Norway international footballers
People from Lillestrøm
Association football defenders
Lillestrøm SK players
Norwegian football managers
Lillestrøm SK managers